This is a list of events in Scottish television from 1994.

Events

January
No events.

February
No events.

March
No events.

April
20 April – 30th anniversary of BBC Scotland on 2.

May
No events.

June
6 June – Death of Scottish actor Mark McManus, best known for his portrayal of Glaswegian detective Jim Taggart. The Taggart series continued following his death.

July
No events.

August
5 August – Scottish soap Take the High Road is renamed High Road.

September
No events.

October
No events.

November
10 November – The first edition of BBC Scotland Investigates is broadcast. It replaces Frontline Scotland.

December
No events.

Debuts

BBC
9 January – The High Life on BBC Scotland on 2 (1994–1995)
Unknown – The Tales of Para Handy (1994–1995)
Unknown – World Tour of Scotland (1994)

ITV
7 January – The Magic House (1994–1996)

Television series
Scotsport (1957–2008)
Reporting Scotland (1968–1983; 1984–present)
Top Club (1971–1998)
Scotland Today (1972–2009)
Sportscene (1975–present)
The Beechgrove Garden (1978–present)
Grampian Today (1980–2009)
Take the High Road (1980–2003)
Taggart (1983–2010)
Crossfire (1984–2004)
Wheel of Fortune (1988–2001)
Fun House (1989–1999)
Win, Lose or Draw (1990–2004)
What's Up Doc? (1992–1995)
Doctor Finlay (1993–1996)
Machair (1993–1999)
Speaking our Language (1993–1996)
Wolf It (1993–1996)
Hurricanes (1993–1997)
Telefios (1993–2000)
Only an Excuse? (1993–2020)

Births
15 February – Marcus Nash, actor

Deaths
6 June – Mark McManus, 59, actor (Taggart)

See also 
1994 in Scotland

References

 
Television in Scotland by year
1990s in Scottish television